This is an incomplete list of lakes of Quebec, a province of Canada.

Larger lake statistics

List of Lakes

0–9
 Lake 3.1416

A

Lake Abitibi in Ontario and Quebec
Lake Albanel
Allioux Lake
Archange Lake (Mékinac)
Lake Arpin
Lake Aylmer

B
Baskatong Reservoir
Batiscan Lake, Quebec
Lac Beauchamp
Lake Bermen
Lake Bienville
Lac aux Biscuits
Reservoir Blanc
Lac La Blanche
Lake Blouin
Blue Sea Lake
Boyd Lake (Quebec)
Brome Lake
Lake Brompton
Burnt Lake (Canada)
Lake Burton (Quebec)

C
Cabonga Reservoir
Caniapiscau Reservoir
Causapscal Lake
Clearwater Lakes or Lac a l'Eau-Claire
Lake Champlain in Quebec and New York, Vermont 
Lake Charest (Mékinac)
Châteauvert Lake (La Tuque)
Lac des Chats
Cinconsine Lake
Lac des Chicots (Sainte-Thècle)
Croche Lake (Sainte-Thècle)
Lake of the Cross (Lac-Édouard)

D
Du Pretre
Du Cardinal
Lake Dana
Lac Deschênes
Dozois Reservoir
Lac Dumoine
Duncan Lake (Quebec)

E
Eastmain Reservoir
Lake Édouard (Quebec)
Lake Evans (Quebec)

F
Lake Fontaine (Mékinac)
Lac du Fou (Mékinac)

G
Gouin Reservoir
Lac Grand, Quebec
Grand Lake Bostonnais
Grand Lac Nominingue
Lake Guindon
Lac Guillaume-Delisle

H
Lake Hackett (Mékinac)
Harrington Lake

J
Jacqueline Lake
Lake Jesuit
Lake Juillet
Julian Lake

K
Lake Kapibouska
Kempt Lake (Matawinie)
Kenogami Lake
Lake Kipawa
Lake Kiskissink

L
La Pêche Lake
Lac à la Perdrix
Lac des Écorces (Antoine-Labelle)
Lac La Blanche
Little Cedar Lake
Leamy Lake
Lake Lescarbot
Lake Louisa
Lacs des Loups Marins
Lake Lovering
Low Lake

M
Lake Magog
Manicouagan Reservoir
Petit lac Manicouagan
Lake Manouane
Lake Masketsi (Mékinac)
Lake Massawippi
Lake Matagami
Lake Matapedia
Lac McArthur
McTavish reservoir
Meech Lake
Mékinac Lake
Lake Mégantic
Lake Memphremagog
Lake Minto
Missionary Lake
Lake Mistassini
Mondonac Lake
Montauban Lake (Portneuf)
Musquaro Lake

N
Lake Naococane
Lac des Nations
Lake Nedlouc
Lake Nemiscau
Petit Lac Nominingue

O
Lake Olga
Opiscoteo Lake
Osisko Lake
Lake Ouareau

P
Lac Paradis
Lake Péribonca
Lake Pierre-Paul (Mékinac)
Pink Lake
Lac des Pins, Aumond, Quebec
Pingualuit crater lake
Pipmuacan Reservoir
Lac Phillipe
Lake Plétipi
Lake Pohenegamook
Lake Poncheville

R
Lake Roberge (Grandes-Piles)
Lake Roberge (Lac-Masketsi)
Robert-Bourassa Reservoir
Roggan Lake

S
Lake Saint François (Estrie)
Lake Saint Francis (Canada)
Lake Saint-Charles
Lake Saint-Jean
Lake Saint-Louis
Petit Lac Saint-François
Lake Saint Pierre
Lac au Saumon
Lac Sauvage (Mont-Blanc)
Lac-des-Seize-Îles, or "Sixteen Islands Lake"
Lac Simard (Temiscamingue)
Selby Lake
Simard Lake (Gouin Reservoir)
Simard Lake (Petit-Mécatina)
Soscumica Lake

T
Taureau Reservoir
Taylor Lake (Quebec)
Lake Témiscouata
Lake Terrien (Mékinac)
Lake Timiskaming in Ontario and Quebec
Lake Tourouvre
Lake Traverse (Mékinac)
Lake Tremblant
Lake Trenche (Lac-Ashuapmushuan)
Lake Troilus
Lake of Two Mountains

V
Lake Ventadour (La Tuque)
Lake Verneuil
Lake Vlimeux (Mékinac)

W
Lake Wabano
Lake Wakuach
Lake Walker
Wapizagonke Lake
Lake Waswanipi
Lake Wayagamac
Lake Wickenden

Y
 Lake Yasinski

See also
List of rivers of Quebec
Geography of Quebec

References

Quebec
Lakes